Edward Richard Stege (September 4, 1913 – March 24, 1985) was an American professional basketball player. He played for the Oshkosh All-Stars in the National Basketball League during the 1937–38 season and appeared in just two games.

References

1913 births
1985 deaths
Amateur Athletic Union men's basketball players
American men's basketball players
Forwards (basketball)
Oshkosh All-Stars players
Wisconsin Badgers men's basketball players